Oh, Flamingo! is a Filipino indie rock band from Manila, formed in 2013. The band consists of Howard Luistro (vocals, guitar), Billie Dela Paz (vocals, bass), Pappu de Leon (guitar),  and Pat Sarabia (drums).

The band released their debut self-titled EP in November 2015. They were the winners of Wanderland's pre-event band competition Wanderband in 2015, and performed at Wanderland Festival in 2016. They released their sophomore EP, Volumes, in 2020.

Originally signed under indie label Wide Eyed Records Manila, the band is currently signed under Sony Music Philippines, a division of Sony Music.

Members

Current Members
 Howard Luistro - vocals, guitar
 Billie Dela Paz - vocals, bass
 Pappu de Leon - guitar
 Pat Sarabia - drums (2017-present)

Past Members 
 Fries Bersales - drums (2013-2017)

Discography

Studio albums
Pagtanda (2023)

EPs
Oh, Flamingo! (2015)
Volumes (2020)

Singles
"June" (2015)
"Reflections" (2015)
"Two Feet" (2016)
"Inconsistencies" (2016)
"Bottom of This" (2018)
"Four Corners" (2019)
"Parara" (2019)
"Naubos Na" (2020)
"Sunsets" (2020)
"Echoes/Psychedelic Sweater" (2020)
"Pag-Ibig Lang Ba" (2021)
"Galit" (2021)
"Sigurado" (2021)
"Anino" (2022)
"Salawahan" (2022)
"Tumatakbong Oras" (2022)

Music videos

References

Filipino rock music groups
Musical groups from Manila
Musical groups established in 2013
2013 establishments in the Philippines
Sony Music Philippines artists